"Fly Me to the Moon", originally titled "In Other Words", is a song written in 1954 by Bart Howard. The first recording of the song was made in 1954 by Kaye Ballard. Frank Sinatra's 1964 version was closely associated with the Apollo missions to the Moon.

In 1999, the Songwriters Hall of Fame honored "Fly Me to the Moon" by inducting it as a "Towering Song".

Background and composition
In 1954, when he began to write the song that became "Fly Me to the Moon", Bart Howard had been pursuing a career in music for over 20 years. He played piano to accompany cabaret singers, but also wrote songs with Cole Porter, his idol, in mind.
In response to a publisher's request for a simpler song, Bart Howard wrote a cabaret ballad which he titled "In Other Words".  A publisher tried to make him change some words from "fly me to the Moon" to "take me to the Moon," but Howard refused. Many years later Howard commented that "... it took me 20 years to find out how to write a song in 20 minutes."

He used his position as a piano accompanist and presenter at the Blue Angel cabaret venue to promote the song, and it was soon introduced in cabaret performances by Felicia Sanders.

Early recordings

Kaye Ballard made the song's first commercial recording, released by Decca in April 1954. A brief review published on May 8, 1954, in Billboard said that "In Other Words" was "...a love song sung with feeling by Miss Ballard." This recording was released as the flipside of "Lazy Afternoon", which Kaye Ballard was currently performing as star of the stage show The Golden Apple.

Over the next few years, jazz and cabaret singers released cover versions of "In Other Words" on EP or LP record albums, including Chris Connor, Johnny Mathis, Portia Nelson, and Nancy Wilson. Eydie Gormé sang the song on her 1958 album Eydie In Love, which reached No. 20 in the Cashbox Album Charts.

Subsequent recordings and uses
In 1960, Peggy Lee released the song on the album Pretty Eyes, then made it more popular when she performed it in front of a large television audience on The Ed Sullivan Show. As the song's popularity increased, it became better known as "Fly Me to the Moon", and in 1963 Peggy Lee convinced Bart Howard to make the name change official. Connie Francis released two non-English versions of the song in 1963: in Italian as "" and in Spanish as "".

In 1962, Joe Harnell arranged and recorded an instrumental version in a bossa nova style. It was released as a single in late 1962. Harnell's version spent 13 weeks on the Billboard Hot 100 chart, reaching No. 14 on February 23, 1963, while reaching No. 4 on Billboards Middle-Road Singles chart. Harnell's version was ranked No. 89 on Billboards end of year ranking "Top Records of 1963". Harnell's recording won him a Grammy Award at the 5th Annual Grammy Awards for Best Performance by an Orchestra – for Dancing. His version was included on his album Fly Me to the Moon and the Bossa Nova Pops released in early 1963, which reached No. 3 stereo album on the Billboard Top LP's chart.

Julie London included a cover of the song for her 1963 album The End of the World. Paul Anka released a version of "Fly Me To The Moon" in 1963, appearing in his album Our Man Around the World.

Frank Sinatra included the song on his 1964 album It Might as Well Be Swing, accompanied by Count Basie. The music for this album was arranged by Quincy Jones, who had worked with Count Basie a year earlier on the album This Time by Basie, which also included a version of "Fly Me to the Moon". Will Friedwald commented that "Jones boosted the tempo and put it into an even four/four" for Basie's version, but "when Sinatra decided to address it with the Basie/Jones combination they recharged it into a straight swinger... [which]...all but explodes with energy". Bart Howard estimated that by the time Frank Sinatra covered the song in 1964, more than 100 other versions had been recorded.

Bobby Womack recorded a version that was released in 1968 on Minit Records, from his album Fly Me to the Moon. His rendition reached No. 52 on the Billboard Hot 100 and No. 16 on the R&B chart. Occasionally on the CBS series WKRP in Cincinnati, an instrumental sampling of "Fly Me To The Moon" was used as a doorbell melody during scenes taking place in the apartment of character Jennifer Marlowe.

In 1991, this song notably featured in the soundtrack of Once Around.

By 1995, the song had been recorded more than 300 times. The Japanese animated series Neon Genesis Evangelion uses several versions of the song sung by Claire Littley, Yoko Takahashi, and various female cast members of the series for the closing music of each episode; everywhere outside Japan, the song was removed from the 2019 Netflix streaming version, 2021 (and later) Blu-ray releases, and cinema screenings due to licensing issues, much to the dismay of fans. According to a poll conducted by Japanese music magazine CD&DL Data in 2016 about the most representative songs associated with the Moon, the cover version by Claire Littley and Yoko Takahashi was ranked 7th by 6,203 respondents. The Claire cover version won the Planning Award of Heisei Anisong Grand Prize among the anime theme songs from 1989 to 1999.

In the 2009 video game Bayonetta, a remix of "Fly Me to the Moon", titled "Fly Me to the Moon (∞ Climax Mix)", sung by Helena Noguerra, is used as the game's battle theme. During the 2020 COVID-19 pandemic a 6-year-old girl in China named Miumiu made national news when her home video of the song was found and edited by a group of Italian musicians led by Bruno Zucchetti, who added an instrumental accompaniment performed from their homes during lockdown.

In the 2021 South Korean Netflix series, Squid Game, the song is featured during the Red Light, Green Light game. This version was sung by South Korean singer Joo Won.

In June 2022, the South Korean mobile game Moonlight Blade M (developed by Tencent) uses a version of the song sung by Taeyeon for being the game's theme track.

NASA association

Frank Sinatra's 1964 recording of "Fly Me to the Moon" became closely associated with NASA's Apollo space program. A copy of the song was played on a Sony TC-50 portable cassette player on the Apollo 10 mission which orbited the Moon, and also on Apollo 11 before the first landing on the Moon. The song's association with Apollo 11 was reprised many years later when Diana Krall sang it at the mission's 40th anniversary commemoration ceremony, and also for mission commander Neil Armstrong's memorial service in 2012.

The Sinatra version was also used in the 2000 NASA related fictional film Space Cowboys.

Certifications

Frank Sinatra's version

References

External links
 ASCAP Foundation: Bart Howard Provides A Musical Gift
 Fly Me to the Moon Chord Study for Guitar
 

1954 songs
Fly Me to the Moon (Bossa Nova)
Songs written by Bart Howard
Frank Sinatra songs
Trini Lopez songs
Tony Bennett songs
Judy Garland songs
Perry Como songs
Patti Page songs
Nancy Wilson (jazz singer) songs
Ella Fitzgerald songs
Johnny Mathis songs
Michael Bolton songs
Al Hirt songs
Neon Genesis Evangelion songs
Pop standards
Songs about outer space
Bobby Womack songs
Minit Records singles
1968 singles
Decca Records singles
Songs about the Moon
Jazz songs